The Ministry of Electricity of Iraq is the federal government ministry concerned with electricity.

It is responsible for both the policymaking and the electricity supply throughout the country. The operational functions (power generation, transmission, load dispatch and distribution) are no longer autonomous corporatized entities, but were reorganized into 18 geographically based directorates within MoE.

Successive ministerial resignations

Since 2003, not a single Minister of Electricity's job has survived the summer season (a total of 18 ministers), with the latest resignation having been submitted in June 2021. That resignation by then-Minister Majed Hantoosh coincided with widespread blackouts which took place during soaring temperatures exceeding , caused in part by Iran having cut energy supplies to the country. Hantoosh resigned a day prior to the Iranian cutback announcement. Some experts estimate that Iraq loses 30 to 50 percent of its electrical supply to outdated circuits.

References

External links

 Iraq Ministry of Electricity official website

Electricity
Electric power in Iraq